Philip "Cincy" Sachs (April 1, 1902 – December 19, 1973) was an American basketball interim head coach for the Detroit Falcons, a Basketball Association of America team, in 1946–47. After taking over the team from Glenn M. Curtis, Sachs posted an 8–18 win-loss record while in charge of the Falcons. Prior to coaching in the BAA, he had spent time coaching the Detroit Gems before they entered the National Basketball League.

Sachs was born in Russia and moved to Cincinnati, Ohio around 1904. His interest in basketball grew as a child, and in August 1917 his family moved to Detroit, Michigan. In 1919 he began his head coaching career; his first-ever team went 30–1 and lost in the Amateur Athletic Union (AAU) championship game. Between 1936 and 1940, Sachs coached the Lawrence Institute of Technology team. In his first season they placed second in the Michigan–Ontario League, and in his second year they tied for first place. His overall record at Lawrence Tech was 56–28.

In Sachs' post-BAA years, he started a boys' basketball school, promoted tournaments, and worked full-time at the Griswold Sporting Goods Company. He also coached the teams who the Harlem Globetrotters would play against, even winning some on occasion. His cumulative overall head coaching record (including high school, AAU, semi-professional, and professional) was 782–158, a winning percentage of .832. He died in Detroit on December 19, 1973 never having married.

Head coaching record

Professional

|-
| style="text-align:left;"|DET
| style="text-align:left;"|
| 26||8||18||.308|| style="text-align:center;"|4th in Western||0||0||0||.000
| style="text-align:center;"|Missed Playoffs
|-
| style="text-align:left;"|Career
| ||26||8||18||.308|| ||0||0||0||.000||  |

References

1902 births
1973 deaths
Basketball coaches from Michigan
Basketball coaches from Ohio
College men's basketball head coaches in the United States
Detroit Falcons (basketball) coaches
Detroit Gems coaches
High school basketball coaches in the United States
Lawrence Tech Blue Devils men's basketball coaches
Russian basketball coaches
Sportspeople from Cincinnati
Sportspeople from Detroit
Emigrants from the Russian Empire to the United States